CBS Mobile is a division of CBS Interactive Inc. charged with building CBS Corporation's wireless business across entertainment, sports and news for CBS, The CW, and CBS Paramount Television. CBS Mobile offers content ranging from mobile video alerts for CBS Mobile News, CBS Sports Mobile and entertainment properties, to mobile Web sites, made-for-mobile video on all major carriers, a 24/7 mobile television network, and partnerships with ad targeting companies.

Features

Aggregate Knowledge 
CBS Mobile has partnered with the company Aggregate Knowledge, which sifts through click-histories of every story on the site and looks at users in aggregate in order to find patterns in those clicks so that it can recommend the most relevant Web content based on what other people with similar tastes are reading and clicking on.

Ads
On February 6, 2008, CBS Mobile and Loopt announced an agreement to deliver the first location-based mobile Web site advertisements in the United States. Through this partnership, advertisers will be able to use GPS and other localization technology to reach consumers at their physical location, enabling them to target users who are near a particular place of business.

Privacy
The ads are not sent via SMS to consumers' mobile devices, but instead appear on mobile Web sites which consumers can access from their cell phones. Loopt has claimed that all consumer location data used is privacy protected by Loopt and its partners under compliance with the industry's practices.

CBS Mobile and Loopt also require that interested customers “opt in” the ad service. And to further protect privacy, the two executives say the ads are delivered anonymously and the location history is not stored.

See also
Loopt
CBS

External links
 CBS mobile web site

References

Paramount Global subsidiaries